The Grotta di Santa Croce is a cave near Bisceglie, in the Apulia region of Italy.

The cave was inhabited during the Later Paleolithic era. It has a rock shelter and a long interior corridor. Red starburst marks are visible 14 meters away from the entrance. A woven basked contained grains of barley and may indicate an offering, and earthenware vessels may have been used to collect water dripping from the ceiling.

References

Archaeological sites in Apulia
Caves of Italy
Landforms of Apulia
Prehistoric sites in Italy
Paleoanthropological sites
Mousterian
Neanderthal sites